Liam Harrison (born 13 December 1983) is a former professional rugby league and rugby union footballer who played in the 2000s and 2010s.

Background
Liam Harrison was born in Barrow-in-Furness, Cumbria, England, he was a pupil at Chetwynde School, and he is the older brother of the rugby league footballer; Ben Harrison.

Playing career
Harrison joined his hometown club in 2005, having previously played for local amateur team Barrow Island. Harrison played with Barrow during several promotions and relegations between the Championship and League 1, the highlight of his time being Barrow's victory in the 2009 Championship, when Harrison was named in the league's team of the year. He reached 300 appearances for the Raiders in 2016, and retired at the end of the 2016 season. His testimonial match was held in Barrow between a Cumbrian XIII selected by Harrison, and the Scotland national team.

He is a former Ireland international, and has represented Cumbria against Tonga, and the United States as well as playing in the Rugby Union Counties Final at Twickenham.

References

External links
(archived by web.archive.org) Barrow Raiders profile

1983 births
Living people
Barrow Raiders players
Cumbria rugby league team captains
Cumbria rugby league team coaches
Cumbria rugby league team players
English people of Irish descent
English rugby league players
English rugby union players
Ireland national rugby league team players
Rugby league wingers
Rugby league players from Barrow-in-Furness
Rugby league centres
Rugby league locks
Rugby league second-rows
Rugby articles needing expert attention